Deep Soul is a studio album by American saxophonist Ronnie Laws, released in 1992 by Par Records. The album reached No. 6 on the Billboard Contemporary Jazz Albums chart.

Overview
Deep Soul was produced by Wayne Henderson.
Artists such as Philip Bailey and Leon "Ndugu" Chancler appeared on the album.

Track listing

Credits
Backing Vocals – Augie Johnson, Gregory Matta, Julie Delgado, Sandra Fairly
Bass – Craig T. Cooper, Nathaniel Philips
Drums – Ndugu Chancler, Rayford Griffin, William "Bubba" Bryant
Guitar – Dwight Sills
Keyboards – Rob Mullins
Scat [Vocal] – Philip Bailey
Soprano Saxophone, Saxophone, Tenor Saxophone, Alto Saxophone, Piccolo Flute – Ronnie Laws
Synthesizer [Programming], Bass, Drums, Keyboards – Noel Classen
Trombone, Producer – Wayne Henderson

References

1992 albums
Ronnie Laws albums